Charles Henry Hylton Stewart (1849 - 1922) was an English clergyman and organist.

Background

Stewart was educated in Bath, Somerset before entering Christ's College, Cambridge in 1870. Migrating to St Catharine's College in 1871, he graduated B.A. in 1874 and M.A. in 1877.

Charles Henry Hylton Stewart was Choral Scholar and Organist of St Catharine's College, Cambridge. On James Pyne's departure, he acted as interim Organist of Chichester Cathedral and was formally appointed in May 1874. The following year he left to take Holy Orders and was successively Minor Canon Precentor of Chester Cathedral (1877–89), Vicar of New Brighton (1889 - 1904), and Rector of Bathwick, Bath (1904–16).

Family

His son Charles Hylton Stewart, was Organist of Rochester Cathedral and of St. George's Chapel, Windsor.

His second son, Bruce Hylton-Stewart, played first-class cricket for Somerset County Cricket Club and appears generally to have used a hyphen in his surname.

References

 

1849 births
1922 deaths
Alumni of St Catharine's College, Cambridge
Organists & Masters of the Choristers of Chichester Cathedral
English organists
British male organists
19th-century English Anglican priests
20th-century English Anglican priests
Male classical organists